Carlo Uttini (1753-1808), was a Swedish ballet dancer.  He was regarded as one of the elite members of the Royal Swedish Ballet in 1773-1804, and was also active as singer of the Royal Swedish Opera (1776–79) and as an actor at the French Theater of Gustav III (1781–92) and at the Royal Dramatic Theatre (1788-1808). He was also inspector of the royal theaters for many years. He was the son of Francesco Antonio Uttini and Rosa Scarlatti.

References 

 Fredrik August Dahlgren: Förteckning öfver svenska skådespel uppförda på Stockholms theatrar 1737-1863 och Kongl. Theatrarnes personal 1773-1863. Med flera anteckningar.

1753 births
1808 deaths
18th-century Swedish ballet dancers
Royal Swedish Ballet dancers
18th-century Swedish male opera singers
18th-century Swedish male actors